Brithdir and Llanfachreth is a community in the county of Gwynedd, Wales, near Dolgellau, and is 93.1 miles (149.8 km) from Cardiff and 178.4 miles (287.1 km) from London. In 2011 the population of Brithdir and Llanfachreth was 751 with 67.3% of them able to speak Welsh.

At the local level, the community elects ten community councillors to Llanfachreth, Brithdir and Rhydymain Community Council. The community also includes the hamlet of Abergeirw.

References

See also
List of localities in Wales by population

 
Communities in Gwynedd